Mimetauge is a monotypic snout moth genus. Its one species, Mimetauge napeogenalis, was described by Eugene G. Munroe in 1970. It is found in Peru.

References

Moths described in 1970
Chrysauginae
Monotypic moth genera
Moths of South America
Pyralidae genera